The 2019 NAIA football season was the component of the 2019  college football season organized by the National Association of Intercollegiate Athletics (NAIA) in the United States. The season's playoffs, known as the NAIA Football National Championship, culminated with the championship game on  December 21 at Eddie Robinson Stadium in Grambling, Louisiana.

Conference changes and new programs

Membership changes

Ottawa (AZ) became eligible for the postseason. Thomas More, which had been an NAIA member from 1947 until leaving for the NCAA in 1990, was immediately eligible for NAIA postseason play as a returning member. Cincinnati Christian ceased to exist during the season.

Conference standings

Postseason

Rankings

See also
 2019 NCAA Division I FBS football season
 2019 NCAA Division I FCS football season
 2019 NCAA Division II football season
 2019 NCAA Division III football season

References